Cosson is a surname. Notable people with the surname include: 

Elizabeth Cosson (born 1958), Australian army officer and public servant
Ernest Cosson (1819–1889), French botanist 
Euretta de Cosson Rathbone (died 2003), British skier
George Cosson (1876–1963), American politician from Iowa
Steve Cosson (born 1968), American theatre writer and director 
Victor Cosson (1915–2009), French road cyclist